The 1965 Chicago White Sox season was the team's 65th season in the major leagues, and its 66th season overall. They finished with a record of 95–67, good enough for second place in the American League, 7 games behind the first-place Minnesota Twins.

Offseason 
 October 15, 1964: Rudy May was traded by the White Sox to the Philadelphia Phillies for Bill Heath and a player to be named later. The Phillies completed the deal by sending Joel Gibson (minors) to the White Sox on November 23.
 October 19, 1964: Don Mossi was released by the White Sox.
 December 1, 1964: Ray Herbert and Jeoff Long were traded by the White Sox to the Philadelphia Phillies for Danny Cater and Lee Elia.
 January 20, 1965: Cam Carreon was traded by the White Sox to the Cleveland Indians, and Jim Landis, Mike Hershberger and a player to be named later were traded by the White Sox to the Kansas City Athletics as part of a three-team trade. Tommy John, Tommie Agee and Johnny Romano were traded by the Indians to the White Sox, and Rocky Colavito was traded by the Athletics to the Indians. The White Sox completed the deal by sending Fred Talbot to the Athletics on February 10.

Regular season

Season standings

Record vs. opponents

Opening Day lineup 
 Don Buford, 2B
 Floyd Robinson, RF
 Johnny Romano, C
 Pete Ward, 3B
 Ron Hansen, SS
 Bill Skowron, 1B
 Danny Cater, LF
 Ken Berry, CF
 Gary Peters, P

Notable transactions 
 June 8, 1965: Danny Lazar was drafted by the White Sox in the 31st round of the 1965 Major League Baseball Draft.

Roster

Player stats

Batting 
Note: G = Games played; AB = At bats; R = Runs scored; H = Hits; 2B = Doubles; 3B = Triples; HR = Home runs; RBI = Runs batted in; BB = Base on balls; SO = Strikeouts; AVG = Batting average; SB = Stolen bases

Pitching 
Note: W = Wins; L = Losses; ERA = Earned run average; G = Games pitched; GS = Games started; SV = Saves; IP = Innings pitched; H = Hits allowed; R = Runs allowed; ER = Earned runs allowed; HR = Home runs allowed; BB = Walks allowed; K = Strikeouts

Farm system 

LEAGUE CHAMPIONS: Tidewater

Notes

References 
 1965 Chicago White Sox at Baseball Reference

Chicago White Sox seasons
Chicago White Sox season
Chicago